Rodney Moore (born May 9, 1950) is an adult video performer, director, and producer.

He entered the business in 1991, shooting couples and barely legal amateurs and selling the tapes. He would eventually meet people within the industry and his career began to flourish. Moore was one of the early adopters of the gonzo/POV style of pornography which immersed the viewer in the experience. Production values tended to be low and spontaneous and the women featured often tending to be near amateurs. Several early series were focused on oral sex with significant emphasis on ejaculation and semen.

He is also a musician, posting several musical videos on his YouTube channel performing original music and cover songs as his real name David Perry.

Awards
2006 AVN Hall of Fame
2013 XRCO Hall of Fame

References

External links
Official website

American male pornographic film actors
American pornographers
Living people
1950 births